Amanda Francisco  (born ) is a Brazilian volleyball player. She competed with her club Rexona Ades at the 2015 FIVB Volleyball Women's Club World Championship.

Clubs
  Rio de Janeiro (2004–2015)
  Brasília Vôlei (2015–2017)
 Dentil Praia Clube (2017–2018)
  Hinode Barueri (2018–2019)
  Sesc-RJ (2019–2021)
  PTT Spor Kulübü (2021–)

Awards

Clubs
 2005–06 Brazilian Superliga –  Champion, with Rexona Ades
 2006–07 Brazilian Superliga –  Champion, with Rexona Ades
 2007–08 Brazilian Superliga –  Champion, with Rexona Ades
 2008–09 Brazilian Superliga –  Champion, with Rexona Ades
 2010–11 Brazilian Superliga –  Champion, with Unilever Vôlei
 2012–13 Brazilian Superliga –  Champion, with Unilever Vôlei
 2013–14 Brazilian Superliga –  Champion, with Unilever Vôlei
 2014–15 Brazilian Superliga –  Champion, with Rexona Ades
 2017–18 Brazilian Superliga –  Champion, with Dentil Praia Clube
 2009 South American Club Championship –  Runner-Up, with Rexona/Ades
 2013 South American Club Championship –  Champion, with Unilever Vôlei
 2015 South American Club Championship –  Champion, with Unilever Vôlei
 2013 FIVB Club World Championship –  Runner-Up, with Unilever Vôlei

References

External links
Fivb statistics
Fivb gallery

1988 births
Living people
Brazilian women's volleyball players
Place of birth missing (living people)
Universiade medalists in volleyball
Wing spikers
Universiade silver medalists for Brazil
Medalists at the 2011 Summer Universiade
Medalists at the 2013 Summer Universiade
Sportspeople from Recife